Ferdinand Jacobus Domela Nieuwenhuis (31 December 1846 – 18 November 1919) was a Dutch socialist politician and later a social anarchist and anti-militarist. He was a Lutheran preacher who, after he lost his faith, started a political fight for workers. He was a founder of the Dutch socialist movement and the first socialist in the Dutch parliament.

Biography

Ferdinand Domela Nieuwenhuis was born in Amsterdam, the son of Ferdinand Jacob Domela Nieuwenhuis, Lutheran pastor and professor of theology, and Henriette Frances Berry. When Nieuwenhuis was ten years old, his mother died. His brother was art collector Adriaan Jacob Domela Nieuwenhuis. His family added the second surname "Domela" in 1859.

After he died in Hilversum at the age of 72 on 18 November 1919, he was one of the first to be cremated and interred at Westerveld in Velsen. His funeral procession, attended by 12,000 sympathizers, traveled through Amsterdam.

References
Notes

Citations

External links

 
 
 Works by Ferdinand Domela Nieuwenhuis at Marxists Internet Archive
 Ferdinand Domela Nieuwenhuis in Biografisch Woordenboek van het Socialisme en de Arbeidersbeweging in Nederland (BWSA)
 Wolfram Beyer: The flaw in the peoples‘ army, in: Peace News No 2447, London June–August 2002 (Kontroverse Karl Liebknecht / Domela Nieuwenhuis), online

1919 deaths
Anarcho-pacifists
Dutch anti-capitalists
Members of the House of Representatives (Netherlands)
Dutch socialists
Dutch anarchists
Dutch pacifists
Former Lutherans
Politicians from Amsterdam
1846 births